Taste of Chaos (or "TOC") was a live music tour that was started in the winter of 2005 by Kevin Lyman, the creator of the successful Warped Tour along with his friend and business partner, John Reese. The Taste Of Chaos tour catered to fans of the post-hardcore, emo, pop punk and metalcore genres, while offering the same low ticket price and festival-style format as the Warped Tour. In 2007, each of the seven bands playing the entire tour was a Warped Tour veteran: five had played the 2006 Warped Tour and two (The Used and Saosin) had played TOC previously.

Taste of Chaos has been called the "Winter Warped Tour" since dates run from October (internationally) through April (in North America) of the next year. The tour was highly successful in 2005 for many of the same reasons as its summer counterpart, including cheap tickets and major bands of the genres. In the fall of 2005, the tour became international with The Used, Story of the Year, and Rise Against playing in Australia, Europe, and Asia. The 2008 lineup was the first to feature Japanese bands, them being Mucc, D'espairsRay and The Underneath.

In 2010, Taste of Chaos founder John Reese stated that although the tour was successful internationally, it had "run its course in America" and would be replaced by the Uproar Festival. Reese stated that the replacement was due to, "running out of bands that fit within the profile of what Taste of Chaos was." Uproar will feature hard rock bands and will begin shortly after the heavy metal tour Mayhem Festival in August 2010. Kevin Lyman expects the tour to continue in Europe, and is unsure if it will return to the US. For the first time since the tour began, Taste of Chaos had no dates in 2011.

On June 18, 2015, it was announced that Taste of Chaos would return with its first festival in five years. The festival took place on October 3 at the San Manuel Amphitheater in California.

It was at a Taste of Chaos show in Orlando, FL, that Fueled By Ramen representative John Janick first saw Paramore, which led to them signing their first major recording contract.

Ernie Ball International Battle Of The Bands Winners 
Ernie Ball International Battle Of The Bands started in 2006, to get popular upcoming small and unsigned bands to play the Taste of Chaos shows in their local towns across many of the tour dates. Fans determine which band is able to win by voting for all bands though the Ernie Ball International Battle Of The Bands Website. The Top 20 Bands in each city, by way of votes will be reviewed by a panel of judges who will select One band out of the top 20 to play live in their hometown on Taste of Chaos Tour.

Judging Criteria
The Top 20 vote getting bands in each city will be reviewed by the judges. One band will be selected based on the following indicators:
Musicianship
Ability to Draw in a Live Setting.

The Judges
Kevin Lyman - Founder of the Vans Warped Tour, co-founder of the Rockstar Taste of Chaos Tour.
John Reese, co-founder of the Rockstar Taste of Chaos, Manager of The Used, Story of the Year.
Sterling Ball - CEO of Ernie Ball Inc.
Brian Ball - Marketing and Artist Relations for Ernie Ball Inc.
Dustin Hinz - Promotions / Marketing for Guitar Center Inc.
Brett Woitunski - CEO and Founder of purevolume.com
John Oakes - Vice President of Freeze Artist Management and co-founder of Chaos Mobile
Mike Kelso - Music Marketing Director for Rockstar Energy Drink.
Kevin Scoles - Artist Relations/Events Marketing Ernie Ball Inc.

Tours by year

Taste of Chaos tours were conducted annually in 2005 through 2010, then again in 2015 and 2016.

Compilations
As does the Warped Tour with their compilations, the Taste Of Chaos tour releases compilations of the bands that are on the tour.
 Taste of Chaos (2005)
 Taste of Christmas (2005)
 The Best of Taste of Chaos (2006)
 The Best of Taste of Chaos Two. (2007)

Certifications

Reviews
 Live Review of April 2006 Calgary, AB, Canada Concert by Chris Andrade for kMNR...Music News Weekly
 Review of April 2008 Los Angeles, CA Concert by Winnie Jaing for LA.Cityzine

References

External links

Myspace
AU & NZ TOC Myspace
UK Myspace
Exclusive Interview with Kevin Lyman, founder of Taste of Chaos, at TrulyHollywood.com.
Ernie ball battle of the bands

Music festivals staged internationally
Taste of Chaos concert tours
Rock festivals in the United States
Rock festivals in Canada
Heavy metal festivals
Music festivals established in 2005
Punk rock festivals